The Kirikiri tanker explosion was a tanker explosion that occurred at Kirikiri, Apapa,  the major port of the city of Lagos State, Nigeria, located in the west of Lagos Island.

Incident
The incident was reported to have occurred on 7 January 2014 when a tanker loaded with about 33,000 liters of gasoline rammed into parked vehicles. The spilling of the gasoline resulted in an explosion that killed about 15 people, leaving several others seriously injured.
Sterling bank was affected, one Automated Teller Machine, 11 cars and 60 shops were burnt as well.
The spokesperson to the National Emergency Management Agency of the South-West Zone, Ibrahim Farinloye confirm the incident.

See also
Alakija tanker explosion

References

Explosions in Nigeria
Explosions in 2014
Tanker explosions
Road incidents in Nigeria
2014 road incidents
2014 in Nigeria
History of Lagos State
January 2014 events in Africa